Michael J. O'Connor (January 16, 1938 - May 5, 1992) was an American animator, best known for being a layout artist for The Simpsons in the first season.

Usually credited as Michael O'Connor or Mike O'Connor, he also worked with DePatie-Freleng studio for the Pink Panther cartoons, and the TV series "The Pink Panther Show", "Fantastic Voyage", "Mission: Magic!", "Star Trek", "Dinky Dog", "He-Man and the Masters of the Universe" and "BraveStarr", among many others.

The Simpsons credits

Layout artist
 "Simpsons Roasting on an Open Fire"
 "Bart the Genius"
 "Moaning Lisa"
 "The Call of the Simpsons"
 "Krusty Gets Busted"

Storyboard artist
 "Moaning Lisa"

External links
 

1938 births
People from Nacogdoches, Texas
American directors
Animators from Texas
1992 deaths